Lohse is a lunar impact crater on the eastern edge of Mare Fecunditatis. It is attached to the north rim of the larger crater Vendelinus. To the north is the prominent Langrenus. The interior of Lohse is rough, being partially covered by ejecta from Langrenus.  It has a small central peak. An older impact is attached to the north rim, designated Langrenus E.

References

 
 
 
 
 
 
 
 
 
 
 
 

Impact craters on the Moon